is the second studio album by Japanese singer Yōko Oginome. Released through Victor Entertainment on March 5, 1985, the album features the single "Mukokuseki Romance". The song "My Catherine" incorporates musical elements of the ABBA songs "Chiquitita" and "Fernando". The album was reissued on March 24, 2010, with two bonus tracks as part of Oginome's 25th anniversary celebration.

The album peaked at No. 26 on Oricon's albums chart and sold over 16,000 copies.

Track listing

Charts

References

External links
 
 
 

1985 albums
Yōko Oginome albums
Japanese-language albums
Victor Entertainment albums